WROX-FM (96.1 MHz) is an alternative rock formatted broadcast radio station licensed to Exmore, Virginia, serving Hampton Roads and the Eastern Shore of Virginia.  WROX-FM is owned and operated by Sinclair Telecable, Inc. WROX's studios are located on Waterside Drive in Downtown Norfolk, and its transmitter is located in Cape Charles.

History
The station signed on in 1986. Though it initially was planned to be a classical music station as WWGH, it instead signed on as WIAV, "Wave 96", with a Top 40/CHR format. It was then co-owned with WVAB (1550 AM).
 
Bishop L.E. Willis later bought the two stations and then bought 92.1, later spinning off WVAB. It then shifted to a dance-leaning CHR as WKSV, "Kiss 96", in December 1988. Six months later, in May 1989, it flipped to Christian after WXRI was sold.

On June 21, 1991, WKSV adopted WMYK's urban format as 'Touch 96' and adopted the call letters WMYA on August 5, 1991.

In October 1993, Willis sold the station to current owner Sinclair Telecable. Shortly after the sale, WMYA flipped to its current format and "96X" branding on October 25.

In 1995, in order to fill a coverage gap in the core portion of Hampton Roads, they put their new 250 watt translator at 106.1 MHz (W291AE) on the air; it was best heard in downtown Norfolk to help eliminate signal dropout in the downtown area. The translator existed until 2004, when WUSH was born.

On July 22, 1998, WROX-FM shifted to Top 40/CHR.  The station terminated all of their on air personalities.  This proved to be extremely unpopular with locals,  as the station reverted back to Alternative Rock one year later on July 16, 1999.   The station's call letters didn't change during this time.

In June 24, 2019, WROX-FM shifted its format from alternative rock to adult album alternative, still branded as "96X".
 
On June 29, 2020, 96X quietly changed its format back to alternative rock in the midst of iHeartRadio's abrupt format flip of WNOH, launching an African American-oriented national news radio network.

References

External links
96X Online

1986 establishments in Virginia
Adult album alternative radio stations in the United States
Radio stations established in 1986
ROX-FM